Julius Lange (1815-1905) was a German numismatist. He is honoured with a commemorative plaque in the city of Potsdam.

Life
Lange was born in Potsdam. He was a butcher and worked at the shop his father had bought in 1810 at Brandenburger Straße 29, which now bears his commemorative plaque. He was keenly interested in coinage, and the recovery and description of ancient finds. In 1880 he helped in the rescue of a major coin find - about 2000 coins found in a field in Michendorf.

Publications
 Die Potsdamer Kirchen- und Innungs-Siegel, in MVGP. - N. F. Bd. 6, Teil 1, Nr. 218
 August Friedrich Eisenhart. (Ein Lebensbild), in MVGP. - N. F. Bd. 6, Teil 1, Nr. 229
 Das Vorwerk Gallin. Zur Geschichte des Potsdamer Schlächtergewerkes, in MVGP. - N. F. Bd. 6, Teil 1, Nr. 246
 Beiträge zur Geschichte des Potsdamer Mühlenwesens, in MVGP. - N. F. Bd. 7, Teil 2, Nr. 269, 1878
 Die Potsdamer Amts-Meyerei, in MVGP.- N. F. Bd. 8, Teil 3, Nr. 272, 1883

References

External links
 Julius Lange biography on Chronik Potsdam

German numismatists
German collectors
1815 births
1905 deaths
People from Potsdam